Kuprlli (in Lycian KO𐊓PΛΛE, circa 480-440 BC) was a dynast of Lycia, at a time when this part of Anatolia was subject to the Persian, or Achaemenid, Empire. Kuprlli ruled at the time of the Athenian alliance, the Delian League.

Present-day knowledge of Lycia in the period of classical antiquity comes mostly from archaeology, in which this region is unusually rich. There is evidence of a fire that destroyed the wooden tombs and temples of Xanthos in around 470 BC. This fire was probably caused by Cimon of Athens when he attacked the sacred citadel in retaliation for the destruction of the Athenian Acropolis by the Persians and their allies, including the Lycians, in 480 BC. The Xanthians, under their dynast, Kuprlli, rebuilt the buildings in stone, which are reflected in the numerous Tombs of Xanthos visible today.

Coinage

Notes

Sources

Lycians
5th-century BC rulers
Rulers in the Achaemenid Empire